"Left and Right" is a song by South Korean boy group Seventeen. It was released as the lead single from their 2020 extended play, Heng:garæ, on June 22, 2020.

Lyrics and composition 
The lyrics to "Left and Right" describe youth "going left and right, not knowing what path to take," according to Woozi, who co-wrote the song. He added that it was a message to young people following their dreams. The song was inspired by conversations with his bandmates about their careers and daily lives, but particularly by main vocalist Seungkwan. The members described it as being different from their other songs, but one that they could immediately imagine performing. It was co-written by Bumzu.

Plagiarism accusations 
The American singer Cupid posted a series of social media posts on August 13, 2020, alleging that Seventeen had plagiarized his song, "Cupid Shuffle." He posted a screenshot from Time magazine that described the refrain as being "resonant of the Cupid Shuffle." Cupid also stated that he felt the plagiarism had disrespected his culture and he wanted financial compensation. Cupid later tweeted that he had contacted Pledis Entertainment, Seventeen's record label, and had not received a reply.

Commercial performance 
"Left and Right" peaked at number one on the Gaon download chart and eight on the digital chart.

Charts

References 

K-pop songs
Korean songs
2020 songs
2020 singles
South Korean songs
Songs involved in plagiarism controversies
Pop songs
South Korean pop songs